Loch Coire an Lochain is a small freshwater loch located below the summit of Braeriach in the eastern Highlands of Scotland.
At 997m above sea level, it is the highest named body of water in the British Isles

References 

Coire an Lochain